Boléro is a 1928 work for large orchestra by French composer Maurice Ravel. At least one observer has called it Ravel's most famous composition. It was also one of his last completed works before illness forced him into retirement.

Composition
The work's creation was set in motion by a commission from the dancer Ida Rubinstein, who asked Ravel for an orchestral transcription of six pieces from Isaac Albéniz's set of piano pieces, Iberia. While working on the transcription, Ravel was informed that Spanish conductor Enrique Fernández Arbós had already orchestrated the movements, and that copyright law prevented any other arrangement from being made. When Arbós heard of this, he said he would happily waive his rights and allow Ravel to orchestrate the pieces. But Ravel decided to orchestrate one of his own works instead, then changed his mind and decided to compose a completely new piece based on the bolero, a Spanish dance musical form.

While on vacation at St Jean-de-Luz, Ravel went to the piano and played a melody with one finger to his friend Gustave Samazeuilh, saying, "Don't you think this theme has an insistent quality? I'm going to try and repeat it a number of times without any development, gradually increasing the orchestra as best I can." Idries Shah wrote that the main theme is adapted from a melody composed for and used in Sufi training. Bruce L. Miller, Director of the Memory and Aging Center of the Weill Institute for Neurosciences at UCSF has, with colleagues, suggested that the repetition in the piece was caused by the onset of progressive aphasia in Ravel, as a result of frontotemporal dementia.

Premiere and early performances

The composition was a sensational success when it premiered at the Paris Opéra on 22 November 1928, with choreography by Bronislava Nijinska and designs and scenario by Alexandre Benois. The orchestra of the Opéra was conducted by Walther Straram. Originally, Ernest Ansermet had been engaged to conduct the entire ballet season, but the musicians refused to play under him. A scenario by Rubinstein and Nijinska was printed in the program for the premiere: Inside a tavern in Spain, people dance beneath the brass lamp hung from the ceiling. [In response] to the cheers to join in, the female dancer has leapt onto the long table and her steps become more and more animated. But Ravel had a different conception of the work: his preferred stage design was of an open-air setting with a factory in the background, reflecting the mechanical nature of the music.

Boléro became Ravel's most famous composition, much to the surprise of the composer, who had predicted that most orchestras would refuse to play it. It is usually played as a purely orchestral work, only rarely staged as a ballet. According to a possibly apocryphal story from the premiere performance, a woman was heard shouting that Ravel was mad. When told about this, Ravel is said to have remarked that she had understood the piece.

The piece was first published by the Parisian firm Durand in 1929. Arrangements were made for piano solo and piano duet (two people playing at one piano), and later, Ravel arranged a version for two pianos, published in 1930.

The first recording was made by Piero Coppola for the Gramophone Company on 8 January 1930. Ravel attended the recording session. The next day, he conducted the Lamoureux Orchestra in his own recording for Polydor. That same year, further recordings were made by Serge Koussevitzky with the Boston Symphony Orchestra and Willem Mengelberg with the Concertgebouw Orchestra.

Toscanini
Conductor Arturo Toscanini gave the American premiere of Boléro with the New York Philharmonic on 14 November 1929. The performance was a great success, bringing "shouts and cheers from the audience" according to a New York Times review, leading one critic to declare that "it was Toscanini who launched the career of the Boléro", and another to claim that Toscanini had made Ravel into "almost an American national hero".

On 4 May 1930, Toscanini performed the work with the New York Philharmonic at the Paris Opéra as part of that orchestra's European tour. Toscanini's tempo was significantly faster than Ravel preferred, and Ravel signaled his disapproval by refusing to respond to Toscanini's gesture during the audience ovation. An exchange took place between the two men backstage after the concert. According to one account, Ravel said, "It's too fast", to which Toscanini responded, "You don't know anything about your own music. It's the only way to save the work". According to another report, Ravel said, "That's not my tempo". Toscanini replied, "When I play it at your tempo, it is not effective", to which Ravel retorted, "Then do not play it". Four months later, Ravel attempted to smooth over relations with Toscanini by sending him a note explaining that "I have always felt that if a composer does not take part in the performance of a work, he must avoid the ovations" and, ten days later, inviting Toscanini to conduct the premiere of his Piano Concerto for the Left Hand, an invitation that was declined.

Early popularity
The Toscanini affair became a cause célèbre and further increased the fame of Boléro. Other factors in the work's renown were the large number of early performances, gramophone records, including Ravel's own, transcriptions and radio broadcasts, together with the 1934 motion picture Bolero starring George Raft and Carole Lombard, in which the music plays an important role.

Music

Boléro is written for a large orchestra consisting of:
 woodwinds: piccolo, 2 flutes (one doubling on piccolo), 2 oboes (one doubling on oboe d'amore), cor anglais, 2 clarinets (one doubles on E-flat clarinet), bass clarinet, 2 saxophones (sopranino and soprano doubling tenor), 2 bassoons, contrabassoon
 brass: 4 horns, 4 trumpets (3 in C, one in D), 3 trombones (2 tenor and one bass trombone), bass tuba
 3 timpani and 4 percussionists: 2 snare drums, bass drum, pair of cymbals, tam-tam
 celesta and harp
 strings

The instrumentation calls for a sopranino saxophone in F, which never existed (modern sopraninos are in E). At the first performance, both the sopranino and soprano saxophone parts were played on the B soprano saxophone, a tradition that continues to this day.

Structure
Boléro is "Ravel's most straightforward composition in any medium". The music is in C major,  time, beginning pianissimo and rising in a continuous crescendo to fortissimo possibile (as loud as possible). It is built over an unchanging ostinato rhythm played 169 times on one or more snare drums that remains constant throughout the piece:

On top of this rhythm two melodies are heard, each 18 bars long, and each played twice alternately. The first melody is diatonic, and the second introduces more jazz-influenced elements, with syncopation and flattened notes (technically it is mostly in the Phrygian mode). The first melody descends through one octave, the second through two octaves. The bass line and accompaniment are initially played on pizzicato strings, mainly using rudimentary tonic and dominant notes. Tension is provided by the contrast between the steady percussive rhythm, and the "expressive vocal melody trying to break free". Interest is maintained by constant reorchestration of the theme, leading to a variety of timbres, and by a steady crescendo. Both themes are repeated eight times. At the climax, the first theme is repeated a ninth time, then the second theme takes over and breaks briefly into a new tune in E major before finally returning to the tonic key of C major.

The melody is passed among different instruments: (1) flute, (2) clarinet, (3) bassoon, (4) Eclarinet, (5) oboe d'amore, (6) trumpet and flute (latter is not heard clearly and in higher octave than the first part), (7) tenor saxophone, (8) soprano saxophone, (9) horn, piccolos and celesta; (10) oboe, English horn and clarinet; (11) trombone, (12) some of the wind instruments, (13) first violins and some wind instruments, (14) first and second violins together with some wind instruments, (15) violins and some of the wind instruments, (16) some instruments in the orchestra, and finally (17) most but not all of the instruments in the orchestra (with bass drum, cymbals and tam-tam).

While the melody continues to be played in C throughout, from the middle onward other instruments double it in different keys. The first such doubling involves a horn playing the melody in C, while a celeste doubles it 2 and 3 octaves above and two piccolos play the melody in the keys of G and E, respectively. This functions as a reinforcement of the first, second, third, and fourth overtones of each note of the melody (though the "G major" is 2 cents flat, and the "E major" is 14 cents sharp). The other significant "key doubling" involves sounding the melody a 5th above or a 4th below, in G major. Other than these "key doublings", Ravel simply harmonizes the melody with diatonic chords.

The following table shows how the composition is played by what instruments (in order):

The accompaniment becomes gradually thicker and louder until the whole orchestra is playing at the very end. Just before the end (rehearsal number 18 in the score), there is a sudden change of key to E major, but C major is reestablished after just eight bars. Six bars from the end, the bass drum, cymbals, and tam-tam make their first entry, and the trombones play raucous glissandi while the whole orchestra beats out the rhythm that has been played on the snare drum from the very first bar. Finally, the work descends from a dissonant B minor over F minor chord to a C major chord.

Tempo and duration
The tempo indication in the score is Tempo di Bolero, moderato assai ("tempo of a bolero, very moderate"). In Ravel's copy of the score, the printed metronome mark of 76 per quarter is crossed out and 66 is substituted. Later editions of the score suggest a tempo of 72. Ravel's own recording from January 1930 starts at approximately 66 per quarter, slightly slowing down later on to 60–63. Its total duration is 15 minutes 50 seconds. Coppola's first recording, at which Ravel was present, has a similar duration of 15 minutes 40 seconds. Ravel said in an interview with The Daily Telegraph that the piece lasts 17 minutes.

An average performance lasts about 15 minutes, with the slowest recordings, such as that by Ravel's associate Pedro de Freitas Branco, extending well beyond 18 minutes and the fastest, such as Leopold Stokowski's 1940 recording with the All American Youth Orchestra, approaching 12 minutes. In May 1994, with the Munich Philharmonic on tour in Cologne, conductor Sergiu Celibidache at the age of 82 gave a performance that lasted 17 minutes and 53 seconds, perhaps a record in the modern era.

At Coppola's first recording, Ravel indicated strongly that he preferred a steady tempo, criticizing the conductor for getting faster at the end of the work. According to Coppola's own report:
Maurice Ravel... did not have confidence in me for the Boléro. He was afraid that my Mediterranean temperament would overtake me, and that I would rush the tempo. I assembled the orchestra at the Salle Pleyel, and Ravel took a seat beside me. Everything went well until the final part, where, in spite of myself, I increased the tempo by a fraction. Ravel jumped up, came over and pulled at my jacket: "not so fast", he exclaimed, and we had to begin again.
Ravel's preference for a slower tempo is confirmed by his unhappiness with Toscanini's performance, as reported above. Toscanini's 1939 recording with the NBC Symphony Orchestra has a duration of 13 minutes 25 seconds.

Reception
Ravel was a stringent critic of his own work. During the composition of Boléro, he said to Joaquín Nin that the work had "no form, properly speaking, no development, no or almost no modulation". In a 1931 interview with The Daily Telegraph, he spoke about the work as follows:It constitutes an experiment in a very special and limited direction, and should not be suspected of aiming at achieving anything different from, or anything more than, it actually does achieve. Before its first performance, I issued a warning to the effect that what I had written was a piece lasting seventeen minutes and consisting wholly of "orchestral tissue without music"—of one very long, gradual crescendo. There are no contrasts, and practically no invention except the plan and the manner of execution.

In 1934, in his book Music Ho!, Constant Lambert wrote: "There is a definite limit to the length of time a composer can go on writing in one dance rhythm (this limit is obviously reached by Ravel towards the end of La valse and towards the beginning of Boléro)."

Literary critic Allan Bloom commented in his 1987 bestseller The Closing of the American Mind, "Young people know that rock has the beat of sexual intercourse. That is why Ravel's Bolero is the one piece of classical music that is commonly known and liked by them."

In a 2011 article for The Cambridge Quarterly, Michael Lanford wrote, "throughout his life, Maurice Ravel was captivated by the act of creation outlined in Edgar Allan Poe's Philosophy of Composition." Since, in his words, Boléro defies "traditional methods of musical analysis owing to its melodic, rhythmic, and harmonic repetitiveness," he offers an analysis that "corresponds to Ravel's documented reflections on the creative process and the aesthetic precepts outlined in Poe's Philosophy of Composition." Lanford also contends that Boléro was quite possibly a deeply personal work for Ravel. As evidence, Lanford cites Ravel's admissions that the rhythms of Boléro were inspired by the machines of his father's factory and melodic materials came from a berceuse Ravel's mother sang to him at nighttime. Lanford also proposes that Boléro is imbued with tragedy, observing that the snare drum "dehumanizes one of the most sensuously connotative aspects of the bolero", "instruments with the capacity for melodic expression mimic the machinery," and the melody consistently ends with a descending tetrachord.

In popular culture 
The piece gained new attention after it was prominently featured in the 1979 romantic comedy 10, costarring Dudley Moore and Bo Derek. This resulted in massive sales, generated an estimated $1 million in royalties and briefly made Ravel the best-selling classical composer 40 years after his death.

The ice dancing pair Torvill and Dean danced to a six-minute version of the work in winning the gold medal in ice dancing at the 1984 Winter Olympics, receiving perfect 6.0s for artistic merit.

The eight-minute short film Le batteur du Boléro (1992) by Patrice Leconte concentrates on the drummer, played by Jacques Villeret, and the problems of his musical part. The film was screened out of competition at the 1992 Cannes Film Festival.

This song played during the torch-lighting ceremony of the 2020 Tokyo Olympics.

It was used by Kamila Valieva in her record-breaking 2021-22 season's free skate program.

Public domain 
This piece's copyright expired on 1 May 2016 for many countries, but not worldwide.

The work is public domain in Canada, China, Japan, New Zealand, South Africa, and many others where the copyright term is "Life + 50 years". It is also public domain in the European Union (where the term is Life + 70 years). In the U.S., Boléro remains under copyright until 1 January 2025 as it was first published in 1929 with the prescribed copyright notice. The last remaining rights owner, Evelyne Pen de Castel, has entered a number of claims that the work was in fact co-composed with the designer Alexandre Benois. The effect would be to extend the copyright until 2039. The claims have been rejected repeatedly by French courts and the French authors society Sacem.

References

Notes

Bibliography

Further reading

External links
 
 

Compositions by Maurice Ravel
Ballets by Maurice Ravel
1928 ballet premieres
Ballets by Bronislava Nijinska
1928 compositions
Compositions in C major
Stefan Zweig Collection